Quentin Rushenguziminega (born 13 November 1991) is a professional footballer who plays as a forward for FC Echallens. Born in Switzerland, he represents Rwanda at international level.

Career
Born in La Sarraz, Rushenguziminega has played club football for Lausanne-Sport, Stade Nyonnais, Echallens, Stade-Lausanne-Ouchy and Yverdon Sport.

Ahead of the 2019–20 season, Rushenguziminega rejoined FC Echallens.

He made his international debut for Rwanda in 2015.

References

1991 births
Living people
Swiss people of Rwandan descent
Rwandan footballers
Swiss men's footballers
Association football forwards
Rwanda international footballers
FC Lausanne-Sport players
FC Stade Nyonnais players
FC Echallens players
Yverdon-Sport FC players
Swiss Challenge League players
Swiss Promotion League players
Swiss 1. Liga (football) players
2. Liga Interregional players
FC Stade Lausanne Ouchy players